Events in the year 1632 in India.

Events
June 17 – Shah Jahan's beloved wife Mumtaz Mahal dies, after giving birth to their 14th child. Soon after, construction of the Taj Mahal, begins.
 Date Unknown - The Portuguese are driven out of Bengal.

References

 
India
Years of the 17th century in India